Liane Michaelis (born 23 April 1953) is a former East German handball player who competed in the 1976 Summer Olympics.

In 1976 she won the silver medal with the East German team. She played three matches.

External links
profile

1953 births
Living people
German female handball players
Handball players at the 1976 Summer Olympics
Olympic handball players of East Germany
Olympic silver medalists for East Germany
Olympic medalists in handball
Medalists at the 1976 Summer Olympics